Vexillum bizonale is a species of small sea snail, marine gastropod mollusk in the family Costellariidae, the ribbed miters.

Description
The length of the shell attains 19 mm.

Distribution
This marine species occurs off New Caledonia and the Philippines; also in the Indian Ocean off Réunion

References

External links
 Reeve, L. A. (1844-1845). Monograph of the genus Mitra. In: Conchologia Iconica, or, illustrations of the shells of molluscous animals, vol. 2, pl. 1-39 and unpaginated text. L. Reeve & Co., London
 Dautzenberg, P. & Bouge, L. J. (1923). Mitridés de la Nouvelle-Calédonie et de ses dépendances. Journal de Conchyliologie. 67(2): 83-159 [15 February 1923; 67(3): 179-259, pl. 2]

bizonale
Gastropods described in 1923